Harry Walter Shlaudeman (May 17, 1926 – December 5, 2018) was an American diplomat, who served successively as Ambassador to Venezuela, Peru, Argentina, Brazil, and Nicaragua.

Biography
Shlaudeman was born in Los Angeles, California, on May 17, 1926. During World War II, he served in the United States Marine Corps from 1944 to 1946. After the war, he attended Stanford University, receiving his B.A. in 1952. Shlaudeman died on December 5, 2018, in San Luis Obispo, California, at the age of 92.

Foreign service career
Shlaudeman joined the United States Foreign Service in 1954. As a Foreign Service Officer, he was posted to Barranquilla 1955–56; to Bogotá 1956–58; to Sofia 1959–62; and to Santo Domingo 1962–64. He moved to Washington, D.C., in 1964, becoming the Dominican Republic desk officer in the United States Department of State. In 1965, he became assistant director of the State Department's Office of Caribbean Affairs, and also served as an advisor to Ellsworth Bunker, the United States Ambassador to the Organization of American States. From 1967 to 1969, he was special assistant to United States Secretary of State Dean Rusk. He returned to the field in 1969 as deputy chief of mission in Santiago, Chile, and then returned to the U.S. in 1973 to become Deputy Assistant Secretary of State for Inter-American Affairs.

President of the United States Gerald Ford nominated Shlaudeman as United States Ambassador to Venezuela and he held this post from May 9, 1975, until May 14, 1976. Ford next nominated Shlaudeman as Assistant Secretary of State for Inter-American Affairs, and he held this office from July 22, 1976, until March 14, 1977.  
President Jimmy Carter nominated him as United States Ambassador to Peru, holding this post from June 28, 1977, until October 20, 1980. Carter then named him United States Ambassador to Argentina, holding this post from November 4, 1980, until August 26, 1983, during Falklands war.

Shlaudeman spent 1983–84 as a member of the National Bipartisan Commission on Central America. In 1984, President Ronald Reagan named Shlaudeman as the President's Special Envoy for Central America. He then served as United States Ambassador to Brazil from August 5, 1986, until May 14, 1989. President George H. W. Bush then nominated him as United States Ambassador to Nicaragua and he served in this post from June 21, 1990, until March 14, 1992. Shlaudeman received the Presidential Medal of Freedom in 1992.

References

External links
Bush's Nomination of Shlaudeman as Ambassador to Nicaragua

1926 births
2018 deaths
United States Assistant Secretaries of State
Politicians from Los Angeles
Stanford University alumni
Military personnel from California
United States Marine Corps personnel of World War II
United States Marines
Ambassadors of the United States to Venezuela
Ambassadors of the United States to Peru
Ambassadors of the United States to Argentina
Ambassadors of the United States to Brazil
Ambassadors of the United States to Nicaragua
Presidential Medal of Freedom recipients
United States Foreign Service personnel
20th-century American diplomats